Robert Jackson (birth unknown – death unknown) was an American Negro league catcher in the 1880s and 1890s.

Jackson made his professional debut for the New York Gorhams in 1887, and played again for New York the following season. He went on to play for the Cuban Giants and Cuban X-Giants, and finished his career with the Chicago Unions, where he played from 1897 to 1899, serving as team captain in 1899.

References

External links
  and Seamheads

Year of birth missing
Year of death missing
Place of birth missing
Place of death missing
Chicago Unions players
Cuban Giants players
Cuban X-Giants players
New York Gorhams players
Baseball catchers